Zermeghedo is a town and comune in the province of Vicenza, Veneto, north-eastern Italy. It is west of SP31 provincial road. Zermeghedo is the comune with the smallest area in Veneto.

Sources
(Google Maps)

Cities and towns in Veneto